
Łomża County is a unit of territorial administration and local government (powiat) in Podlaskie Voivodeship, north-eastern Poland. It came into being on January 1, 1999, as a result of the Polish local government reforms passed in 1998. Its administrative seat is the city of Łomża, although the city is not part of the county (it constitutes a separate city county).

As of 2019 its total population is 50,914, out of which the population of Nowogród is 2,155, that of Jedwabne is 1,626, and the rural population is 47,133.

Neighbouring counties
Apart from the city of Łomża, Łomża County is also bordered by Kolno County and Grajewo County to the north, Mońki County and Białystok County to the east, Zambrów County and Ostrów Mazowiecka County to the south, and Ostrołęka County to the west.

Administrative division
The county is subdivided into nine gminas (two urban-rural and seven rural). These are listed in the following table, in descending order of population.

References

 
Land counties of Podlaskie Voivodeship